Richard Roy Douglas (12 December 1907 – 23 March 2015) was an English composer, pianist and arranger. He worked as musical assistant to Ralph Vaughan Williams, William Walton, and Richard Addinsell, made well-known orchestrations of works such as Les Sylphides (based on piano pieces by Chopin) and Addinsell's Warsaw Concerto, and wrote a quantity of original music.

Life
Roy Douglas was born at Royal Tunbridge Wells. He was self-taught in music. He gained experience writing film scores with Karma (1933) and Dick Turpin (1933). He assisted people such as Mischa Spoliansky on The Ghost Goes West (1935), Arthur Benjamin on Wings of the Morning (1937), Anthony Collins on Sixty Glorious Years (1938), Nicholas Brodzsky on Freedom Radio (aka A Voice in the Night, 1941) and Tomorrow We Live (aka At Dawn We Die, 1943), Noël Coward in In Which We Serve (1942), John Ireland in The Overlanders (1946), and Walter Goehr in Great Expectations (1946).

Working with Richard Addinsell
In 1937 Roy Douglas first worked with Richard Addinsell, on the score for Dark Journey.  They went on to work on such films as Victoria the Great (1937), The Lion Has Wings (1939), Gaslight (1940), Old Bill and Son (1941), Dangerous Moonlight (1941, which contained the famous Warsaw Concerto), Love on the Dole (1941), This England (1941), This Is Colour (1942), The Big Blockade (1942), The Day Will Dawn (aka The Avengers, 1942) and The New Lot (1943).

The extent of his involvement in Addinsell's scores is somewhat unclear.  Some sources suggest Addinsell had good musical ideas but no skills in orchestration, and that Douglas's role was much more than a mere assistant or copyist.  Some even suggest that the Warsaw Concerto was entirely the work of Roy Douglas.

Working with William Walton
Douglas also worked for a long period with William Walton. This collaboration started in November 1940, on the film score for Major Barbara.  He later worked on Went the Day Well?, Next of Kin, The First of the Few (1942) and Henry V (1944).  He generally orchestrated the shorter sections of Walton's film scores, based on Walton's jottings on 2 or 3 staves, and according to specific instructions or in Walton's style. Walton was commissioned to write the score for The Bells Go Down, but declined and instead offered it to Roy Douglas to write his own music.

Douglas and Ernest Irving helped Walton complete the ballet The Quest by his birthday, 29 March 1943, in time for its premiere performance only a week later.

Walton arranged the Valse from Facade for piano, but all other piano arrangements from the score were made by others, including Douglas, Constant Lambert, Herbert Murrill and Mátyás Seiber.

Douglas worked with Walton on the revised version of Belshazzar's Feast, but regretted Walton's decision to use less percussion than in the original. The vocal score of Troilus and Cressida was largely the work of Roy Douglas, assisted by Franz Reizenstein in Act III.

Working with Ralph Vaughan Williams
From 1947 until the elder composer's death in 1958, Roy Douglas worked as Ralph Vaughan Williams' musical assistant and amanuensis.  His job included producing legible copies of RVW's scores, and in the process he identified numerous issues of orchestration needing resolution, deciphered RVW's often illegible handwriting, and made various suggestions for improvement, most of which were accepted. They worked together on symphonies nos. 6–9, the opera The Pilgrim's Progress, the Tuba Concerto and other works.  In this way he was able to produce manuscripts that were even more authoritative than the composer's originals, since all issues of notation had been discussed and clarified with the composer himself. He has been described as "the most important surviving witness of Vaughan Williams's technique as a musician".

Douglas was not generally exposed to RVW's new compositions until they had been substantially sketched in short score. For example, he was first made aware that RVW had written his 6th Symphony in a letter from the composer dated 13 February 1947, but he was not given the score to work on until almost seven months later.

In an apparent departure from the usual method, Douglas was asked to write out the score for the Tuba Concerto in 12 days to meet a deadline, but without the opportunity of checking with RVW's piano sketches.  This later led to uncertainties of scoring, which had to be clarified.

Sometimes Douglas's involvement with Vaughan Williams' works became more than that of a mere assistant.  RVW considered the orchestral suite arranged in 1952 from his 1949 cantata Folk Songs of the Four Seasons to be so much the work of Roy Douglas, that he arranged for it to be published as Douglas's composition based on his own, rather than his own arrangement of an earlier work.  This was first recorded in 2012.

Death
Roy Douglas died on 23 March 2015, at the age of 107. He never married; he lived with his sister Doris until her death in 1997.

Major compositions

As composer
 Oboe quartet (1932)
 2 quartets for flute, violin, viola and harp (1934/1938)
 Trio for flute, violin and viola (1935)
 Six Dance Caricatures for wind quintet (1939)
 Two Scottish Tunes for strings (1939)
 Elegy for strings (1945)
 Cantilena for strings (1957)
 Festivities and A Nowell Sequence for strings (1991)
 scores for 5 feature and 6 documentary films
 music for 32 radio programmes

As arranger or orchestrator
Frédéric Chopin: Les Sylphides (1936; written to improve on what he considered "very bad orchestrations" of Chopin's music)
 Richard Addinsell: the "Warsaw Concerto" from the film Dangerous Moonlight (1941)
 Lord Berners: ballet Les Sirènes (1946); the autograph score is entirely in Douglas's hand; Douglas was sworn to secrecy about this involvement, uncredited, and poorly paid)
Georges Bizet: Jeux d'enfants (5 numbers; these, along with 2 numbers orchestrated by Hershy Kay, were added to the 5 numbers scored by Bizet himself as his Petite Suite, to round out the complete orchestral version of Jeux d'enfants)
Franz Liszt: Funérailles
Ralph Vaughan Williams: Songs of Travel (the composer orchestrated only the first, third and eighth songs, Douglas doing the remaining six songs)

References

External links
 Biography, potential source for re-expansion of this article 
 Profile by Royal Tunbridge Wells Choral Society in PDF
 Douglas, Roy Profile on Naxos website
 
 Stephen Lloyd, William Walton: Muse of Fire
 kentnews.co.uk: "Tributes paid to one of Britain’s most distinguished musicians, Roy Douglas, after he dies aged 107"
 The Telegraph: "Roy Douglas, composer - obituary"
interview British Entertainment History Project

1907 births
2015 deaths
Place of death missing
20th-century British male musicians
20th-century classical composers
20th-century English composers
21st-century British male musicians
21st-century classical composers
Amanuenses
English centenarians
English classical composers
English male classical composers
Men centenarians
Musicians from Kent
Musicians from Royal Tunbridge Wells
People from Royal Tunbridge Wells